The Civil Administration is the Israeli governing body that operates in the West Bank. It was established by the government of Israel in 1981, in order to carry out practical bureaucratic functions within the territories captured by Israel in 1967. While formally separate, it was subordinate to the Israeli military and the Shin Bet. 

The Civil Administration is subordinate to a larger entity known as Coordinator of Government Activities in the Territories (COGAT), which is a unit in the Defense Ministry of Israel. Among its functions are coordination with the Palestinian Authority. After 2002, the distinction set forth in the Oslo Accords restricting Israeli military operations in area A was de facto terminated.

Formation, background and nature of organization 
The creation of a civil administration for the West Bank and Gaza Strip was incorporated within the Camp David Accords, signed by Egypt and Israel in 1978. The Civil Administration intended to exchange the military government Israel had established in 1967. The Camp David Accords did not include the Palestine Liberation Organization (PLO) in the talks over issues of the Palestinian-claimed territories.

A modification which preceded the actual creation of the body was a change in the "chain of command", consolidating power within the military.

The nature of this body was defined in Military Order No. 947, by the 1981 military government of the West Bank and Gaza:

After the creation of the Civil Administration, civil affairs were not separated with the military. While all the civil branches came under the control of the Civil Administration and did not have to report to the military, in practice, the Civil Administration was subordinate to the military and the Shin Bet. At the managerial level, most of the staffers were Israelis. The internal security service Shin Bet was also deeply involved behind the scenes. Thomas Friedman describes it as a "euphemism for military administration", and it was deeply suspected by Palestinians, who led waves of protests against it. Twenty-five West Bank mayors called for its abolition; the Israeli military arrested the rioters and suppressed the protests.

The military's role extended to appointments, licenses and permits, and legislative powers. The Civil Administration was used as a front to dispense patronage among the occupied population. There was an attempt to create Village Leagues by Menachem Milson in 1978, who later became the head of the Civil Administration. The Village Leagues consisted of "a coalition of rural thugs...who had no standing in the community". The Palestinians saw the Leagues as a collection of collaborators and traitors. Political factions and the PLO were outlawed by the Israeli military, with a conscious policy of "divide and rule". This policy of co-optation was combined with "Iron Fist" operations of the then Defense Minister, Ariel Sharon.

Later developments 
Through the implementation of the Oslo Accords agreed upon by Israel and the PLO, the Civil Administration transferred some of its governance capacities to the Palestinian National Authority in 1994. Since 1994, the Civil Administration has largely focused on matters involving the issuing of movement permits. Upon the implementation of Israel's unilateral disengagement plan from the Gaza Strip in 2005, the Civil Administration has exercised authority exclusively in the West Bank.

Activities 
The Israel Defense Forces description of the mandate of the Civil Administration purports that "the unit acts as a source of information integrating human quality and technological progress which coordinates activities of government bureaus, the IDF, and security establishments opposite the Palestinians through the application of government policies in factors pertaining to civilians. Additionally, the "MATPASH" Unit promotes humanitarian issues, infrastructure projects, and economical projects."

The Civil Administration is practically a "counterpart" of the Interior Ministry of Israel, and operates with its nine Israeli – District Coordination Offices (DCO), operating in the West Bank. The Civil Administration is responsible for all administrative aspects of the local population within Area C of the West Bank, and is responsible for coordinating with the Palestinian Authority, which has full administrative authority in Area A, and limited authority in Area B, as per the Oslo Accords. After 2002, with Operation Defensive Shield, the agreement in the Oslo Accords disallowing Israeli military operations in Area A was effectively abolished by the latter. The only part of the West Bank which the IDF does not enter is the Palestinian Presidential compound, the Mukataa inside Ramallah. As a working rule, the Palestinian security forces are left to operate by day, and Israeli raids take place in this area during the night. Among other things, it is responsible for the entrance permits from the West Bank to Israel, travel permits within the West Bank, and work permits (for Palestinians seeking to enter from the West Bank to Israel in order to work). It also decides on matters concerning the approval of new and already built housing units in settlements. The Civil Administration that operates as part of the COGAT unit receives its budget from the Israeli government.

References

External links 

 Official COGAT/MATPASH Website 
 IDF spokesperson's description 
 Israeli gov't hiring inspectors to enforce settlement freeze , Palestine Note (blog), 30 November 2009
 Barak boosts building inspector staff, Tovah Lazaroff, Jerusalem Post, 30 November 2009 
 Israel to Recruit More Building Inspectors to Enforce a Freeze on West Bank Construction, Isabel Kershner, New York Times, 29 November 2009

 
Law of Israel
Politics of Israel
Israel Defense Forces
History of Palestine (region)
Late modern history of Jerusalem
Arab–Israeli conflict
1980s in Israel
1990s in Israel
States and territories established in 1981
States and territories disestablished in 1994
Military occupation
Israeli occupation of the West Bank